John Harvey Bunzel was an American academic. He served as president of San Jose State University from 1970 to 1978 and was a senior research fellow at the Hoover Institution since 1978. He was formerly a member of the United States Commission on Civil Rights.

Early life and education
Bunzel graduated from Kent School in 1942, a AB in political science from Princeton University, an MA in sociology from Columbia University, and a PhD in political science from the University of California, Berkeley. He served in the United States Army 1943–1946.

Activism at Princeton
Upon returning from the Army in 1946, Bunzel helped found the Princeton Liberal Union and was its first president.  An unaffiliated student organization active from 1946 to 1951, the Liberal Union adopted a platform that embraced several progressive positions but foremost among them was opposition to racial and religious discrimination, a cause which they actively and effectively pursued within Princeton itself. Fulfilling Bunzel's goal, in the fall of 1949 the Liberal Union worked with NAACP president Walter White to send recruitment letters to over 500 historically black high schools encouraging students to apply to Princeton, after which three were accepted.
John Bunzel ’46, whose education had been interrupted by his service in World War II, returned to campus in 1946 to finish his final two years of college. He later said his time in the Army had sparked a passion for civil rights. He led Princeton University students who shared Broderick’s commitments to form the Liberal Union in 1946 and served as its president until his graduation in 1948.

References

Notes

External links
 Finding guide to Bunzel's papers at the Hoover Institute

1924 births
2018 deaths
American male writers
Columbia Graduate School of Arts and Sciences alumni
Presidents of San Jose State University
Princeton University alumni
Kent School alumni
UC Berkeley College of Letters and Science alumni
United States Army soldiers
United States Commission on Civil Rights members
Writers from New York City
California Democrats
Stanford University faculty
Michigan State University faculty
San Francisco State University faculty
Hoover Institution people